I, Pet Goat II is a 2012 Canadian animated short film written, directed, produced and edited by Louis Lefebvre. The film features a commentary on American society and politics, particularly covering presidents George W. Bush and Barack Obama, with allusions to Osama bin Laden, the War on Terror, Biblical theology, and Arabian imagery in a post-apocalyptic setting. The title is a reference to The Pet Goat (often erroneously referred to as My Pet Goat), the book President Bush read to children at Emma Booker School in Sarasota, Florida at the time of the September 11 attacks which ends stating "more to come". The film is known for its strong use of cryptic symbolism.

Development
Louis Lefebvre began production on I, Pet Goat II in 2006. By 2008, he had established his studio, Heliofant, in Montreal, Quebec, employing various 3D animators, and the Tanuki Project who scored the film. Lefebvre predominantly used Autodesk Maya, V-Ray, FumeFX and RealFlow software for rendering sprites and animation. I, Pet Goat II was released on June 24, 2012.

Awards
I, Pet Goat II won the following awards: 
 Ocelot Robot Film Festival 2012 - Best Short Film
 Fubiz - Best of 2012 (14th of 100)
 The Future of Animation - The Short of the Week Award
 4th International Animated Short Film Festival "Ciné court animé" (Roanne) - 3D Movie Creation Best Film Distinction
 Bitfilm Festival - 3D Film Award
 Toronto Animation Arts Festival International
 Short Shorts Film Festival & Asia 2013
 20th Granada Short film festival - International Competition

References

External links
 
 

2012 short films
2012 animated films
2012 films
2010s animated short films
2010s science fiction films
Canadian animated short films
Canadian animated science fiction films
Computer-animated short films
Cultural depictions of Barack Obama
Cultural depictions of George W. Bush
Cultural depictions of Osama bin Laden
Films based on the September 11 attacks
Animated post-apocalyptic films
2010s Canadian films